Kink.com is a San Francisco-based bondage internet pornography company that runs a group of websites devoted to BDSM and related fetishes. Kink.com, along with Kink Studios, LLC, Hogtied.com and Behindkink.com are DBAs for Cybernet Entertainment LLC, the parent company that operates the studio.

In March 2018, Alison Boden, the former VP of Technology, became the new CEO of Kink.com. She helmed the company until founder Peter Acworth returned in 2021.

Origin
Kink.com was started by UK native Peter Acworth in 1997 while he was a doctoral candidate in finance at Columbia University. After reading a story in a British tabloid about a fireman who made £250,000 in a short period by starting an Internet pornography website, Acworth decided to start a pornographic web site of his own. Since Acworth had what he described as a lifelong interest in bondage, he oriented the site toward BDSM pornography. The site was called Hogtied.com and initially featured content that was licensed from other primary producers. The site was successful and was soon grossing several thousand dollars per day. Acworth left his graduate studies to work on the site full-time.

In 1998, Acworth moved the company from New York City to San Francisco. Finding that sales were leveling off because other sites were using the same content, Acworth began producing his own material, initially featuring himself with various models whom he found through Craigslist or through his photographer friends. He opened the company's second site, Fucking Machines, in 2000, and has since opened 26 additional subscription Web sites.
Several Web sites under the Kink.com umbrella feature directors who relocated following the demise of Insex as a result of US government pressure in 2005, but offer more of a focus on consensuality than Insex was known for.

Acquisition of the San Francisco Armory
In late 2006, Kink.com purchased the San Francisco Armory for $14.5 million, for use as a production studio. A group known as the Mission Armory Community Collective formed to oppose Kink.com's use of the building and in early February 2007 held a public protest in front of the building.

At one point, there were plans to demolish part of the building to make way for a condominium development. Such news brought in supporters who welcomed Kink.com's preservation of the historic building as part of an overall attempt to revitalize and bring back business to the area, without altering the appearance of the historic building.

San Francisco mayor Gavin Newsom also expressed concern over the Kink.com purchase, and scheduled a special meeting of the San Francisco Planning Commission in March 2007 to review the company's use of the building. The meeting was well-attended by both supporters and opponents of the Kink.com purchase. One opponent, anti-pornography campaigner Melissa Farley compared the images produced by Kink.com to images of prisoner abuse at Abu Ghraib, and testified against the purchase.

The Planning Commission ruled that Kink.com was not in violation of any law or zoning requirement.

Although Kink.com has stated that its activities would be invisible to the surrounding neighborhood, La Casa de las Madres, a neighboring women's shelter, announced that they would be leaving the location because of the media scrutiny of Kink.com's presence.  In addition to utilizing the Armory for its own productions, Kink.com also rents space in the historic building to local independent filmmakers to use as locations in non-pornographic narrative films and videos.

By 2013 Kink.com was converting rooms at the Armory into webcam studios that independent webcam models could rent. In January 2017, Kink.com announced that it would cease to use the Armory for film production.

In 2018, Acworth sold the Armory for $65 million.

Specialty web sites

In 2007, the company's web site Fucking Machines was involved in a trademark dispute when the United States Patent and Trademark Office refused to grant a trademark for the name of the site, asserting that it was obscene. Also in 2007, the company began streaming regular live shows, in part as a defense against copyright infringement. By 2008 live shows were being streamed by Device Bondage, a Kink.com bondage site, and erotic wrestling site Ultimate Surrender began streaming its competitive matches live in 2008.

In 2008, the company added on-demand technology to its web sites, selling updates to their websites on a per-episode basis rather than strictly by subscription. This system recently began adding third-party content, including that from Germany's Marquis.

Also in 2008, the company launched a site called Bound Gods, a gay bondage site directed by Van Darkholme (also the director of Naked Kombat). Bound Gods was launched under a new gay-focused division, KinkMen.com.

In 2014, the company announced that it was stopping production on its "wildly popular" Public Disgrace and Bound in Public sites, and changing Hardcore Gangbangs to make it more explicitly the fantasy of the female participant. Kink announced that it was increasing educational efforts, with the aim of "demystifying alternative sexualities" and would be welcoming the public into The Armory. It wished to turn Kink.com into a lifestyle brand à la Playboy.

As of 2022, their main network boasts over 90 channels, 27 are Kink exclusives from nine studios. Making it the largest fetish network to date.

In October 2022, Kink launched KinkMen as its own, exclusive paysite within the Kink network, bringing in performers from across the male kink and fetish sphere, and feauring directors such as Dominic Pacifico and Micah Martinez.

Controversy
In early March of 2023, the website came under fire for accusations of unsafe filming practises from model Alexis Tae against first-time director Lydia Black who ignored Tae's need to cut during filming. The accusation was later corroborated by fellow model Kathryn Mae, who was an extra on set on the day of the violation. 

Following the accusations, were complaints of racism against both Black and Acworth as the CEO of Kink.com from model Avery Jane.

Documentary

In 2013 Kink, a documentary, was made about the company.

Award nominations
 2008, Kink.com was nominated for a 2009 AVN Award in a new category, Best Adult Web Site.
 2010 XBIZ Award Nominee - Innovative Company of the Year

Awards
 2009 XBIZ Award - FSC Leadership Award
 2009 XBIZ Award - Original Web Content
 2011 AVN Award - Best Alternative Web Site
 2012 XBIZ Award - Fetish Studio of the Year
 2013 XBIZ Award - Specialty Site of the Year
 2013 AVN Award - Best Alternative Website
 2014 AVN Award - Best Alternative Web Site
 2014 AVN Award - Best Web Premiere - Public Disgrace 31515
 2014 XBIZ Award - Specialty Site of the Year
 2014 XBIZ Award - BDSM Site of the Year (DivineBitches.com)
 2015 XBIZ Award - Adult Site of the Year - BDSM
 2015 CyberSocket Web Award - Best Hardcore/Fetish Site (KinkMen.com)
 2016 XBIZ Award - Adult Site of the Year - BDSM
 2016 CyberSocket Web Award - Best Hardcore/Fetish Site (KinkMen.com)
 2016 TEA Award - Best Scene (Yasmin Lee and Lucas Knight on TS Seduction)
 2016 AVN Award - Best Alternative Website
 2017 AVN Award - Best BDSM movie - Deception: A XXX Thriller
 2017 AVN Award - Best Alternative Website
 2017 XBIZ Award - Adult Site of the Year — BDSM
 2017 TEA Award - Best Scene (Threesome with Aubrey Kate, Will Havoc, and Phoenix Marie on TS Seduction)
 2017 StorErotica Award - Fetish Company of the Year (Kink by Doc Johnson)
 2017 Adultex Award - Best Fetish/Alternate Product Range (Kink by Doc Johnson)
 2018 XBIZ Award - BDSM Site of the Year
 2018 XBIZ Award - BDSM Release of the Year (Whipped Ass 21: Masochistic MILFs)
 2018 XBIZ Award - Fetish Product/Line of the Year (Kink by Doc Johnson)
 2018 StorErotica Award - BDSM Product of the Year (Power Banger Sex Machine, Kink by Doc Johnson)
 2018 CyberSocket Web Award - Best Hardcore/Fetish Site (KinkMen)
 2018 NightMoves Award - Best Fetish/Taboo/Specialty Release (Hardcore Gangbang Parodies #3)

See also
 Bondage pornography
 Insex
 Kink (sexual)

References

Further reading
 Lynn, Regina. (February 1, 2018). "Real Sex Tantalizes as Processed Porn Gets Boring" Wired.com. Retrieved October 17, 2018.

External links

 Official website
 

Adult entertainment companies
Bondage pornography
BDSM-related mass media
Companies based in San Francisco
American erotica and pornography websites
Fetish subculture
Internet properties established in 1997
Mission District, San Francisco
American pornographic film studios
Pornography in San Francisco
1997 establishments in New York City